Irmantas Zelmikas (born 3 January 1980) is a Lithuanian former professional football defender.

Career
Zelmikas has spent the majority of his career in his native Lithuania with several spells at FBK Kaunas. He also played numerous times for the Lithuanian national team.

Zelmikas had a trial spell with Scottish Premier League club Dundee United in 2010. He scored goals at both ends in a friendly match against Hull City.

Honours
A Lyga
2000, 2002, 2003
Lithuanian Cup
2002, 2005
Lithuanian Super Cup
2002

National Team
 Baltic Cup
 2005, 2010

References

External links

1980 births
Living people
Lithuanian footballers
Association football defenders
Lithuania international footballers
Lithuanian expatriate footballers
Expatriate footballers in Belarus
Expatriate footballers in Ukraine
Lithuanian expatriate sportspeople in Ukraine
Expatriate footballers in Israel
Expatriate footballers in Norway
Ukrainian Premier League players
Israeli Premier League players
FK Inkaras Kaunas players
FK Žalgiris players
FK Kareda Kaunas players
FBK Kaunas footballers
FK Šilutė players
FC Partizan Minsk players
SC Tavriya Simferopol players
FK Sūduva Marijampolė players
Hapoel Ra'anana A.F.C. players
FK Banga Gargždai players